This is a list of visual novel engines.

Digital Novel Markup Language
Digital Novel Markup Language (DNML) is one of the first scripting language game engines for creating visual novels, also known as interactive fiction games. DNML was developed using C++ by a Japanese programmer known by their Internet name, Karin. The initial release was in 1998. The programming structure is similar to HTML, which made it easy to produce dōjin games. DNML was succeeded by software like NScripter, KiriKiri and Ren'Py.

There have been various attempts to create a more modern DNML interpreter. However the only known successful project is DNML Midori, a full reimplantation of DNML that has several features of its own. While it is free to use, it is not open source. As of 2021, it was last updated in 2019 and development seems to be concluded.

KiriKiri

 is a scripting engine by Japanese developer "w.dee", initially released in 1998. It is almost exclusively used with the KAG (KiriKiri Adventure Game System) framework as a visual novel engine. Usually, the package of the two components is regarded as the whole engine, and referenced with major version numbers. Thus, the current version is called KiriKiri2/KAG3. It is available under the GNU General Public License, though commercial licenses can be acquired if somebody wishes to expand the software without disclosing the changes.

KiriKiri is often used as a more modern and expandable replacement of the older NScripter engine. It has been used in both dōjin and commercial visual novels, the most well known of which are TYPE-MOON's Fate/stay night and Fate/hollow ataraxia. The Nekopara game series, available on Steam, also uses a modified version of Kirikiri.

For KiriKiri2 and Kirikiri Z's implementation of KAG there is a module called 鱧天 (Hamotem). which provides a myriad of plugins and a ready made template to build games on. As TyranoBuilder is to TyranoScript, there are several programs which create a graphical editor on top of the KAG script. The most well known of these is NVLMaker, which also has a cloud platform.

NScripter

NScripter is a visual novel engine written by Naoki Takahashi. Due to its simplicity and its liberal license (while it is not open-source software, royalty-free commercial use is permitted), it quickly became popular in Japan, and was used for a number of high-profile commercial and dōjin titles, such as HaniHani and Tsukihime. NScripter is closed-source and only available for Windows.

A number of cross-platform clones have been written, the best-known being ONScripter, an example of free and open-source software implementation. Its popularity among the visual novel localisation community is attributed to the ease of modifying the engine to support languages other than Japanese. It strives to maintain compatibility with visual novels designed for NScripter. ONScripter is based on the Simple Directmedia Layer (SDL) library, and can thus be used to run NScripter games on platforms supported by SDL, such as OS X, Linux, PSP and the iPod.

ONScripter-EN is a branch of ONScripter that is maintained separately by the English-language community, for convenience and for ease of introducing enhancements that are suited to the community. PONScripter (abbreviation for "Proportional-OnScripter") is a fork of ONScripter-EN. Its stated goal is to provide an easy porting target for translation projects, with emphasis on Western languages. PONScripter has made heavy modifications to the ONScripter-EN base code, and is deliberately backwards-incompatible. PONScripter was originally maintained by Peter "Haeleth" Jolly. Since September 2009, it is maintained by Mion of Sonozaki Futago-tachi, the Higurashi no Naku Koro ni translation group.

KScripter is a Flash-based scripting engine that was inspired by NScripter but uses ActionScript and SWF.

NVList 
NVList is an open source visual novel engine that runs on Windows, Mac OS, Linux, Android, and even online (through an applet). It is coded in the Java language, even though the scripts are written in Lua. It is being updated to this day on GitHub. It has all the functionality required for a Visual Novel, and more. It has support for resolution scaling and switching, along with pixel and vertex shaders.

Ren'Py
The Ren'Py Visual Novel Engine is a free software engine. The easy to learn script language allows anyone to efficiently write large visual novels, while its Python scripting is enough for complex simulation games. Ren'Py has proved attractive to western hobbyists; over 1000 games use the Ren'Py engine, nearly all in English. Visual novels, kinetic novels, role-playing games, simulation games, and many other games can be made with Ren'py.

Suika2
Suika2 is a free and open source visual novel engine. It is lightweight, compact, and portable by design. Games created with Suika2 can run on Desktop, Mobile and Web Platforms.  Having Japanese and International language options, it is one of the few Japanese Visual Novel Engines supporting multiple languages out of the box. Its simple command based syntax allows for easy creation of Visual Novels, while its GUI system provides the framework for a robust visual experience. The provided Visual Debugger allows easy testing of scripts, and facilitates packaging of game files.

TyranoBuilder 
TyranoBuilder is a commercial visual novel engine. Projects created in this engine can be compiled for use on Windows, Mac, Android, iOS, and browser-based web apps.

Geek & Sundry said it uses "a simple drag-and-drop system and the interface makes it easy to see how the scene will look as you change elements on the fly." The GUI is similar to GameMaker, usually bypassing any need for scripting. TyranoBuilder acts as an interface for TyranoScript, a web-focused engine created in Japanese language (a partial English version exists). TyranoBuilder and TyranoScript use a syntax similar to the scripting language of KiriKirki, although less flexible.

A unique feature of TyranoBuilder is its support for Live2D. Robert Ciesla, author of Game Development with Ren’Py: Introduction to Visual Novel Games Using Ren’Py, TyranoBuilder, and Twine said, "TyranoBuilder one ups Ren’Py in the visual category, since it includes an impressive character animation system called Live2D. Said system may be implementable in Ren’Py, but probably not as easily."

Asobu, an independent game development community and shared workspace, hosted a TyranoBuilder Meetup in Japan in January 2020. A small group of developers (including the 'Tyrano Game Festival 2018' 2nd-place winner, Takumi Kato) were in attendance, and the event corrdinator said there will be future events.

References

Video game engines